The Voice: la plus belle voix (season 3) is the third season of the French reality singing competition, created by media tycoon John de Mol.  It was aired from 11 January 2014 to 10 May 2014 on TF1.

One of the important premises of the show is the quality of the singing talent. Four coaches, themselves popular performing artists, train the talents in their group and occasionally perform with them. Talents are selected in blind auditions, where the coaches cannot see, but only hear the auditioner.

Three of the coaches continued from season 2, namely were Florent Pagny, Jenifer and Garou. But the fourth coach Louis Bertignac from seasons 1 and 2 was replaced by British singer Mika. Kendji Girac of Team Mika was the third season winner with finale held on May 10, 2014.

Overview

 – Winning Coach/Contestant. Winner and finalists are in bold, eliminated contestants in small font.
 – Runner-Up Coach/Contestant. Final contestant first listed.
 – 2nd Runner-Up Coach/Contestant. Final contestant first listed.

Results

Stage 1 : « Auditions à l'aveugle » (Blind Auditions)
The Blind Auditions were broadcast on 11, 18, 25 January and 1, 8 and 15 February 2014.

Episode 1: January 11, 2014

Episode 2: January 18, 2014

Episode 3: January 25, 2014

Episode 4: February 1, 2014

Episode 5: February 8, 2014

Episode 6: February 15, 2014

Stage 2 : « Battles Musicales » (Musical Battles)
During the battles, each coach was assisted by another singer as assistant coach, during the preparations to the show:
Florent Pagny was assisted by Hélène Ségara and Pascal Obispo;
Jenifer was assisted by Stanislas and Élodie Frégé;
Mika was assisted by Kylie Minogue;
Garou was assisted by Corneille and Gérald de Palmas.

Episode 7: February 22, 2014

Episode 8: March 1, 2014

Episode 9: March 8, 2014

Episode 10: March 15, 2014 

Teams after the battle rounds

Contestants retained after battle rounds, who will go to the live rounds (in blue, the contestants stolen by other teams):

Stage 3 : « épreuve ultime » 
"L'épreuve ultime" was a new step introduced for the first time in the French show lasting two episodes. The process was designed to reduce contestants to six by team.

Within their respective teams, each coach would select three contestants each to sing a song of their choice. With each coach, two of his three contestants would forward to the live shows and the third would be eliminated.

Garou and Jenifer presented their "trios" on 22 March 2014, with Mika and Florent Pagny following suit on 29 March 2014. Later on, contestants Louane and Atef were invited in the first on 22 March, the second on 29 March.

Episode 11 - L'épreuve ultime 1: 22 March 2014 
At the beginning of the episode, the four coaches sang together "Vieille canaille" from  Serge Gainsbourg and Eddy Mitchell, au début de l'émission.

Episode 12 - L'épreuve ultime 2: 29 March 2014 

Contestants after "l'épreuve ultime"
Candidats retenus après l'épreuve ultime, et qui vont participer aux primes en direct :

Stage 4 : « Primes » (Live Shows) 
With 24 contestants remaining, six per team 6, in each live episode called "Primes", one or more contestants would be eliminated from the team. During the first two episodes, the contestants were divided into trios (2 per team). One contestant would be saved by public vote, one by coach of each respective team and one eliminated.

Episode 13 - prime 1: 5 April 2014 
At the beginning of the episode, the four coaches sang "Relax, Take It Easy" from Mika, "Tourner ma page" from Jenifer, "Et un jour une femme" from Florent Pagny, and "Seul" from Garou.

Songs outside competition

Episode 14 - prime 2: 12 April 2014 

Song outside competition 

Contestants after first two episodes in prime stage

Episode 15 - prime 3: 19 April 2014 
At the beginning of the episode, the four coaches sang "Quand on arrive en ville" from Luc Plamondon and Michel Berger.

With 16 contestants remaining, 4 per team, the public vote saves one contestant, and the coach of each respective team another contestant with the third contestant from each team eliminated.

Episode 16 - prime 4 - Quarter-finals: 26 April 2014 
With Final 12 remaining, three per team, the public vote saves one contestant each, coach of each respective team would save another contestant and one would be eliminated.
  
At the beginning of the 16th episode, the four coaches sang "Kiss" from Prince.

Episode 17 : prime 5 - Semi-finals: 3 May 2014 
In the semi-finals and the finals, the two best candidates per team qualify in each team.

Votes are based on 150 points in total: Each coach would place his 50 points between his final 2 contestants. He should not distribute them equally but should give advantage to one of his /her two finalists. The votes of the public will be allocated based on votes for a total of 100 points. One contestant per team reaches the final.

Performances outside competition

Episode 18 - prime 6 - Final: 10 May 2014 
The final of season 3 is scheduled for 10 May 2014 on TF1.

The four finalists are:

References

External links 
 

2014 French television seasons
3